Bursera hindsiana is a Mexican species of trees in the frankincense family in the soapwood order. It grows in Sonora and in both of the states of Baja California. This includes several of the islands in the Gulf of California.

Bursera hindsiana is a small tree. Bark is brown on the first-year branches, gray on the older stems. Leaves are pinnately compound with 5 or 7 leaflets, rarely more than 3 cm long, hairy on both sides.

References

hindsiana
Flora of Northwestern Mexico
Plants described in 1844